Echinops sphaerocephalus, known by the common names glandular globe-thistle, great globe-thistle or pale globe-thistle, is a Eurasian species of globe-thistle belonging to the tribe Cardueae within the family Asteraceae.

Description
 

Its erect branching, gray, slightly wrinkled and hairy stems bear the occasional large, soft, sharply toothed, sharp-lobed pointed green leaves. They are sticky hairy above, and white woolly below.

Atop each stem is an almost perfectly spherical inflorescence up to 6 cm in diameter, packed with white or blue-gray disc florets. It flowers from June until September.

The flowers are pollinated by insects (usually bees, wasps and butterflies) (entomogamy) and are hermaphrodite (self fertilization or autogamy). The fruits are hairy cylindrical achenes about 7 to 8 mm long. They ripen from September through October. The seeds are dispersed by wind (anemochory).

Distribution
This species is widespread across much of Eurasia but it lives on other continents where it was introduced, including North America where it is a widespread weed. It is very common in the mountains of southern France and southern and central Europe.

Habitat

Subspecies
Echinops sphaerocephalus subsp. albidus (Boiss. et Spruner) Kozu.
Echinops sphaerocephalus subsp. sphaerocephalus
Echinops sphaerocephalus subsp. taygeteus (Boiss. & Heldr.) Kožuharov

Gallery

References

External links

ASTERACEAE, SUNFLOWER FAMILY, The Jepson Manual, University of California
United States Department of Agriculture Plants Profile
Globe Thistle, Ontario Weeds
Echinops sphaerocephalus, alterVISTA
Czech Botany

sphaerocephalus
Plants described in 1753
Taxa named by Carl Linnaeus
Flora of Europe
Flora of Asia